Sidney is a town in Delaware County, New York, United States. The population was 5,774 at the 2010 census. The town is at the northwestern corner of the county and contains the village of Sidney.

History

The town was formed in 1801 from the town of Franklin. On April 7, 1801, the town was named "Sidney" in honor of British naval officer Sir Sidney Smith.

Geography
The northern town line, marked by the Susquehanna River, is the border of Otsego County, and the western town boundary  is the border of Chenango County. The village of Sidney, the main settlement in the town, is at the western end of the town along the Susquehanna River. Interstate 88 runs through the northern side of the town, with access from Exits 9, 10, and 11.

Demographics

As of the census of 2000, there were 6,109 people, 2,565 households, and 1,641 families residing in the town.  The population density was 121.5 people per square mile (46.9/km2).  There were 2,987 housing units at an average density of 59.4 per square mile (22.9/km2).  The racial makeup of the town was 96.35% White, 0.85% Black or African American, 0.33% Native American, 0.77% Asian, 0.03% Pacific Islander, 0.39% from other races, and 1.28% from two or more races. Hispanic or Latino of any race were 1.44% of the population.

There were 2,565 households, out of which 29.6% had children under the age of 18 living with them, 47.7% were married couples living together, 11.7% had a female householder with no husband present, and 36.0% were non-families. 30.3% of all households were made up of individuals, and 16.1% had someone living alone who was 65 years of age or older.  The average household size was 2.35 and the average family size was 2.90.

In the town, the population was spread out, with 25.4% under the age of 18, 6.5% from 18 to 24, 25.3% from 25 to 44, 23.9% from 45 to 64, and 18.9% who were 65 years of age or older.  The median age was 40 years. For every 100 females, there were 90.8 males.  For every 100 females age 18 and over, there were 87.0 males.

The median income for a household in the town was $30,078, and the median income for a family was $35,351. Males had a median income of $28,168 versus $25,014 for females. The per capita income for the town was $16,335.  About 11.1% of families and 14.3% of the population were below the poverty line, including 19.9% of those under age 18 and 10.3% of those age 65 or over.

Controversy

Sidney town supervisor, Robert McCarthy, began an effort to declare a Muslim cemetery of the Osmanli Naksibendi Hakkani Dergahi (a Sufi Muslim center) illegal. He was quoted saying that the town board "will be seeking to have these bodies disinterred and stop future burials."

When questioned about the legal basis for town action he responded, "I don't know what the exact law is". On August 12, 2010, the town board voted unanimously to authorize Town Attorney Joseph A. Ermeti to commence with legal proceedings against the Osmanli Naksibendi Hakkani Dergah. MSNBC's Keith Olbermann brought instant fame to the small town of Sidney when he announced Bob McCarthy as “The Worst Person in the World”  and Comedy Central's Stephen Colbert joked about the residents of Sidney being scared of Muslim vampires.

Members of the Sufi Muslim center had contacted and demonstrated to Bob McCarthy that the cemetery was in fact legal (established in 2005 ) and had the permission of the municipal government to establish a cemetery. In addition, both burials were registered with the town. McCarthy forwarded all inquiries to the Town Attorney Joe Ermeti, who delayed response to the Muslim community until October 14, 2010 - the day of Sidney's town meeting. The statement made by Sidney's lawyer and town board said they would not pursue legal charges against the Sufi cemetery, but would also not recognize its legality. McCarthy refused to apologize to the Sufi community and to the town. The Huffington Post published an article detailing the incident which subsequently gained national and international attention. McCarthy still maintained the law was on the side of the Sidney Town Board, while lawyers and Hans Hass, spokesman for the Muslim center, contend otherwise. An official statement was provided by the Muslim center detailing the cemetery issue and legal documentation.

Communities and locations in the Town of Sidney
East Sidney
Franklin Depot
Sidney – the Village of Sidney
Sidney Center
South Unadilla
Youngs

Notable people
 Mary Jane Aldrich (1833–1909), temperance reformer and lecturer.
 Evans Carlson (1896-1947), Marine Corps General, leader of "Carlson's Raiders."

References

External links
 Town of Sidney official website

Towns in Delaware County, New York